Darren George Henry (born 4 August 1968) is a British politician who has served as the Member of Parliament (MP) for Broxtowe since 2019. A member of the Conservative Party, he defeated the outgoing MP and former leader of Change UK, Anna Soubry. Henry briefly served as an Assistant Government Whip from September to October 2022.

Early life
Henry was born in Bedford, England, to a Jamaican-born father, Harry. His mother, Gloria, was from Trinidad. During his youth, Henry attended Rushmoor School.  Prior to entering politics, Henry served in the Royal Air Force. On 8 April 1993, when he was serving as a corporal, he was commissioned as a flying officer in the supply branch, with seniority from 28 July 1992. He was promoted to flight lieutenant on 28 July 1996 and to squadron leader on 1 January 2007.

Political career
In early 2014, Henry joined the Conservatives, noting that whilst campaigning was possible in military service it had not occurred to him to do so up until this point.

During Henry's first year of membership, he aided Robert Jenrick in his campaign to win the 2014 Newark by-election.

After a few months of membership, he sought nomination to be the Conservative candidate in North West Hampshire. He was listed, but lost to former Deputy Mayor of London Kit Malthouse.

At the 2015 general election he was selected as the Conservative candidate for Wolverhampton North East, in the West Midlands. He was also employed as General Manager at Harvest Fine Foods. He came second to Labour's Emma Reynolds, seeing a decline of 4.4% in the Conservative vote share.

Henry served as a parish councillor in Shrewton, Wiltshire before resigning in September 2019.

Henry was also Conservative member of the Wiltshire Council unitary authority from May 2017 until January 2020. As Henry assumed office as Member of Parliament for Broxtowe on 12 December 2019, this meant that he briefly had a dual mandate for both Wiltshire and Broxtowe.

In early 2019, Henry was shortlisted to be Wiltshire Police and Crime Commissioner but lost the selection to fellow Wiltshire councillor Jonathon Seed in April 2019. The May 2020 Wiltshire police and crime commissioner election was postponed until 2021; it was won by Seed, who did not take up the post after a historical drink-driving offence was revealed.

In summer 2019, he was shortlisted, along with Tony Devenish and Felicity Buchan, for the ultra-marginal West London seat of Kensington. He failed to be selected. Following this, he was selected as the Conservative Parliamentary candidate for Broxtowe in September 2019.

At a 2019 general election hustings in Broxtowe, Henry said that he might introduce a private member's bill for a ban on payday loans advertising, and suggested that food bank users needed help understanding money and budgeting. At the same hustings he stated; "When people are really, really down, and when people haven't got the money, one of the things they can look to do is to get a payday loan or something like that." Reaction to this speech was audibly negative.

During the election, Henry is said to have leveraged an existing relationship with Robert Jenrick to have Jenrick commit to funding Stapleford (a ward within Broxtowe) with £25 million, but only if Henry won the seat and the Conservative party won a majority.

In his maiden speech made on 25 June 2020, which was also in the week marking 72 years since the arrival of the Windrush generation to the UK, Henry spoke negatively of Labour for its representation of immigrants and those of the Windrush generation. Henry spoke of his pride in being the first Conservative parliamentarian of West Indian heritage. On 21 July 2020, in a debate on the Windrush Lessons Learned Review, Henry used a question to state "party politics is shameful" and also used the opportunity to criticise Labour for not working with the Government to "right the wrongs of Windrush".

Henry was elected co-chair of the Midlands Engine All-party parliamentary group on 22 July 2020.

In March 2021, Henry apologised after a member of his staff was alleged to have turned up at the home of a blogger to get him to take down an article. Henry said he was unaware the incident had happened until it was published online.

In January 2022, a briefing released by the TaxPayers' Alliance revealed Henry to be "Britain's most expensive MP..." after £280,936 of expense claims during the 2020/2021 financial year.

Following the resignation of 50 ministers and aides from the service of Prime Minister Boris Johnson on 7 July 2022, Henry reaffirmed his support for the Prime Minister.

Personal life
Darren Henry is married to Caroline, who was elected as the Nottinghamshire Police and Crime Commissioner for the Conservative Party in 2021 and banned from driving for six months in 2022 after breaking the speed limit five times. They have twins.

References

External links

Living people
1968 births
UK MPs 2019–present
Conservative Party (UK) councillors
Conservative Party (UK) MPs for English constituencies
Members of Wiltshire Council
Royal Air Force airmen
English people of Trinidad and Tobago descent
English people of Jamaican descent
Black British MPs